Deportivo Géminis is a women's volleyball club based in Comas, Lima, Peru. The club have won the Liga Nacional Superior de Voleibol title three times.

Current squad
Squad as of the 2016-17 LNSV

Honours

Peruvian championships (3)
Women's South American Volleyball Club Championship: 0
Runner-up (1): (2010) 

Liga Nacional Superior de Voleibol: 3 (2007–08, 2009–10, 2011–12)
Runner-up (1): (2010-11)

References

Peruvian volleyball clubs
Sport in Lima